The men's 200 metre butterfly competition of the swimming events at the 1975 Pan American Games took place on 21 October. The last Pan American Games champion was Jorge Delgado of Ecuador.

This race consisted of four lengths of the pool, all lengths being in butterfly stroke.

Results
All times are in minutes and seconds.

Heats

Final 
The final was held on October 21.

References

Swimming at the 1975 Pan American Games